USS Challenge is a name used more than once by the U.S. Navy:

 , a tugboat built in 1889 by J. H. Dialogue and Sons, Camden, New Jersey.
 , a tugboat delivered to the Navy, 22 November 1944.

United States Navy ship names